John McDougall was an Ontario political figure. He represented Middlesex North in the Legislative Assembly of Ontario as a Conservative member from 1875 to 1879.

He lived in Komoka and served as reeve for Lobo Township.

External links 

The Canadian parliamentary companion and annual register, 1875, HJ Morgan

Year of birth missing
Year of death missing
Canadian people of Scottish descent
Progressive Conservative Party of Ontario MPPs